Shannon Applegate is an American author, lecturer, and historian from the state of Oregon. Her works include Skookum:  An Oregon Pioneer Family's History and Lore (1988) and Living Among Headstones: Life in a Country Cemetery (2005). She is also the co-editor of Talking on Paper: Oregon Letters and Diaries, sixth edition (1993).

In 2007, she was named one of the eight recipients to be given the Governor's Arts Awards for 2006-2007 by Gov. Ted Kulongoski.

She is a direct descendant of Charles Applegate who blazed the Oregon Trail in 1843 along with his brothers, Jesse Applegate and Lindsay Applegate. Her father was Colonel Rex Applegate, the author of acclaimed  military and police training manuals.

Their home is the "oldest house in the State of Oregon still occupied by its original family". Her daughter, Jessica Applegate Brown, owns and manages Applegate House Vineyards at the Charles Applegate Home, often referred to as Applegate House.

References

External links
personal website

Living people
Writers from Oregon
Historians of the Pacific Northwest
American women historians
20th-century American historians
20th-century American women writers
21st-century American historians
21st-century American women writers
Year of birth missing (living people)